Elizabeth Jane "Libba" Birmingham is a former women's basketball coach. She served as the first head coach of the Mississippi State Bulldogs women's basketball team from 1974 through 1977, compiling a career record of 29–38.

Birmingham later became Women's Athletic Director for the school.

Head coaching record

References

American women's basketball coaches
Mississippi State Bulldogs women's basketball coaches
Year of birth missing (living people)
Living people